Samuel Fenton Cary (February 18, 1814 – September 29, 1900) was an American politician who was a member of the U.S. House of Representatives from Ohio and significant temperance movement leader in the 19th century. Cary became well known nationally as a prohibitionist author and lecturer.

Early life
Cary was born on February 18, 1814, in Cincinnati, Ohio, where he attended public schools. He graduated from Miami University in 1835 and from the Cincinnati Law School in 1837.

Early career
Cary was admitted to the bar in 1837, practicing law out of his in office in Cincinnati. He was elected a judge in the Ohio State Supreme Court, but decided to pass on the position, continuing to practice law.

He stopped working in law in 1845 to become a farmer and also to devote himself to temperance and anti-slavery groups. He gave lectures and wrote books on prohibition and slavery matters. He was a delegate to the Republican National Convention in 1864 supporting Abraham Lincoln for a second term. Cary served as paymaster general for the State of Ohio under Governors Bartley and Bebb. He then became Collector of Internal Revenue for Ohio's first district in 1865.

U.S. House of Representatives 
In 1867, Cary was elected to the 40th United States Congress as an Independent Republican to represent Ohio's second district, fining the vacancy left by the resignation of Rutherford B. Hayes who had just been elected Governor of Ohio. He served in Congress from  November 21, 1867, to March 3, 1869. There, he became the chairman of the Committee on Education and Labor. Cary voted against the impeachment of President Andrew Johnson. He lost the election to the Forty-first Congress in 1868 to Job E. Stevenson.

Campaigns for lieutenant governor and vice president
In 1875, Cary was also an unsuccessful candidate for Lieutenant Governor of Ohio.

Cary joined the Greenback Party and was the nominee for Vice President of the United States in the 1876 election after Newton Booth declined to run. He ran with Peter Cooper who was running for the presidency against Rutherford B. Hayes. Hayes won the presidency along with his running mate, William A. Wheeler. Cooper and Cary also came behind the Democratic Party candidates Samuel J. Tilden and Thomas A. Hendricks.

Honors 
Frank Page, the founder and first mayor of Cary, North Carolina, named the town after Cary because he admire Cary's temperance speech given in the community previously.

Personal 
Cary was twice married. First to Maria Louisa Allen on October 18, 1836; she died of consumption on September 25, 1847. They had three children: Martha Louisa Cary, Ella Woodnutt Cary and Lou Allen Cary. In 1849, he married Lida Stillwell. They had three children: Olive Cary, Samuel Fenton Cary Jr., and Jessie Cary.

Cary lived out final twenty years of his life as a writer and lecturer. He died at the Cary Homestead in College Hill, Cincinnati, Ohio, on September 29, 1900. He is interred with his family in Spring Grove Cemetery in Cincinnati.

References

External links

The Cary Heritage Museum

|-

|-

|-

Cary, North Carolina
Farmers from Ohio
American temperance activists
Burials at Spring Grove Cemetery
Members of the United States House of Representatives from Ohio
Miami University alumni
Ohio lawyers
Politicians from Cincinnati
1876 United States vice-presidential candidates
University of Cincinnati College of Law alumni
Writers from Cincinnati
1814 births
1900 deaths
Ohio Republicans
Ohio Democrats
Ohio Greenbacks
Republican Party members of the United States House of Representatives
Greenback Party vice presidential nominees
19th-century American politicians
19th-century American lawyers